Francis De Greef (born 2 February 1985 in Rumst) is a retired Belgian road bicycle racer, who rode professionally between 2008 and 2015 for the  and  teams.

Major results

2005
 1st Flèche Ardennaise
 3rd Time trial, National Under-23 Road Championships
 6th Overall Volta a Lleida
2006
 5th Overall Giro della Valle d'Aosta
 5th Flèche Ardennaise
2007
 1st  Time trial, National Under-23 Road Championships
 1st Overall Volta a Lleida
1st Stages 3 & 5a (TTT)
 1st Circuit du Hainaut
 2nd Overall Ronde de l'Isard
 3rd Overall Triptyque des Barrages
 4th Overall Le Triptyque des Monts et Châteaux
 6th Overall Giro delle Regioni
 9th Overall Giro della Valle d'Aosta
 10th Time trial, UCI Under-23 Road World Championships
2009
 8th Overall Driedaagse van West-Vlaanderen
2014
 1st Combination classification Tour du Limousin

References

External links

Belgian male cyclists
1985 births
Living people
People from Rumst
Cyclists from Antwerp Province